Yeh Aag Kab Bujhegi is a 1991 Indian film directed by Sunil Dutt. It stars Sunil Dutt, Rekha in lead roles. It was the last movie produced by Ajanta Arts. The lyrics and music for the film were by Ravindra Jain

Plot
The movie begins with a play where Professor Krishnanand is giving a social message against dowry. He heads the department of sociology in his college. He is lives with his only daughter Pooja and his mother. Radha, a professor of law and colleague of Krishna admires him in his crusade against dowry. Radha is engaged to marry Ranvir, but on the day of her marriage, Ranvir's father demands a dowry; Radha cancels the marriage. Radha's father commits suicide after this perceived humiliation. Radha gets moral support from Krishna and establishes a female support society which works for dowry victims.

Pooja's marriage is also arranged with Mohan but Mohan's mother is not happy as there is no dowry. Mohan and his evil brother-in-law make various plans and force Pooja to ask for money from her father. However, on the day of Karwa Chauth the truth is revealed to Pooja and also she realises her husband and his family want to kill Prof. Krishna for his property. In order to save himself Mohan kills Pooja with the help of his family and the news is spread that Pooja 's death was an accident. Krishna makes an unsuccessful attempt to seek justice for his daughter but due to lack of evidence Mohan is released.

Heartbroken, Krishna decides to take revenge for his daughter. On the night of Diwali, he records the confession of Mohan and his family, then kills Mohan and Roshan Lal for what they did to Pooja. In the courtroom Krishna stops Judge Ranvir from passing his judgement and accepts that he killed Mohan and Roshan Lal to avenge his daughter who was brutally killed, and reveals that the investigating officer was also bribed. The judge orders a reopening of Pooja's murder case and the culprits are sent to judicial custody. The judge also accepts that the law needs to be improved in order protect the daughters from being dowry victims. In the climax, Krishna is arrested and people are shown to be supporting him.

Cast

 Sunil Dutt as Professor Krishnanand
 Moon Moon Sen as Professor Krishnanand Wife ,Only Photo in Photo Frame (Cameo Role)
 Rekha as Professor Radha
 Kabir Bedi as Ranveer Singh
 Pradeep Kumar as Umrao Singh
 Satyen Kappu as Raghuveer Singh
 Sheeba Akashdeep as Pooja 
 Dina Pathak as Pooja's Grandmother
 Shakti Kapoor as Mohan Agarwal 
 Bindu as Mrs. Agrawal
 Roopesh Kumar as Kanhaiyalal Gupta
 Ranjeet as Sulaiman
 Mukri as Shankar
 Iftekhar as Judge
 Sudhir as Investigating Officer Roshanlal
 Bharat Kapoor as defence Lawyer of Mohan Agarwal 
 Chandrashekhar  as Senior Police Commissioner

Soundtrack

References

External links
 

1991 films
1990s Hindi-language films
Films scored by Ravindra Jain